Jhr. Andries Cornelis Dirk de Graeff (7 August 1872 – 24 April 1957) was a Governor-General of the Dutch East Indies and a Dutch minister for foreign affairs.

Family
Andries Cornelis Dirk de Graeff was a descendant of the De Graeff-family from the Dutch Golden Age.
He was a son of the general consul and Dutch minister in Japan Dirk de Graeff van Polsbroek, and Bonne Elisabeth Royer. De Graeff married jonkvrouw Caroline Angelique van der Wijck, daughter of jonkheer Carel Herman Aart van der Wijck, Governor-General of the Dutch East Indies. They had seven children; a grandson of his is Jan Jaap de Graeff.

Career

De Graeff was an unorthodox man of a Remonstrant background, who was mistakenly assumed to be a CHU sympathizer. Between 1890 and 1895 he studied law at Leiden University, where he met his friends for life, Johan Paul Count of Limburg Stirum and Jhr. Frans Beelaerts van Blokland, and then moved to the Dutch East Indies. De Graeff became secretary official and general secretary of the governor-general Alexander Willem Frederik Idenburg. In 1914 he became a member, and in the beginning of 1917 vice president of the Council of the Dutch East Indies.

After his East Indies stint, de Graeff became envoy in Tokyo (1919-1922) and in Washington (1922-1926), and was governor-general of the Dutch East Indies from 1926–1931. There, de Graeff tried in vain to conduct an ethical regime that catered to moderate nationalists.  

De Graeff was also the Dutch minister for foreign affairs for an unspecified period during 1936 and 1937. During De Graeff's term as Foreign Minister, the Netherlands returned to pure neutrality. Throughout 1936, de Graeff served as a "sort of stooge" to British Foreign Secretary Anthony Eden in relation to the question of weakening the League of Nations. 

De Graeff wanted to modify the League until it became "purely consultative", coax Germany back into it, and abolish forever all sanctions "except the one Sanction that an aggressor would be automatically expelled from the League."

Chivalric Orders & Honors 
Andries Cornelis Dirk de Graeff received various honors:

 Officer in the Order of Orange-Nassau, August 31, 1909
 Knight in the Order of the Netherlands Lion, 30 August 1913
 Commander of the Order of the Netherlands Lion, 29 April 1930
 Bearer of the Grand Cross Order of Oranje-Nassau, 10 September 1931
 Grand Cross of the Order of the White Lion, 29 April 1937

Notes

References
 Voor u persoonlijk. "Brieven van minister van Buitenlandse Zaken jhr. A.C.D. de Graeff aan gezant J.P. graaf van Limburg Stirum (1933–1937)", Ned. Hist. Genootschap (1986)
 C. Fasseur, Graeff, jhr. Andries Cornelis Dirk de (1872–1957), in: Biografisch Woordenboek van Nederland, deel II, 190
 B. de Graaff, Een welwillend man met een vrij gering werkelijkheidsbegrip, in: "De Nederlandse ministers van Buitenlandse Zaken in de twintigste eeuw" (1999)
 H.T. Colenbrander, Bij het aftreden van gouverneur-generaal De Graeff, in De Gids 95 (1931) III, 373–404;
 J.E. Stokvis, Een landvoogdij, in De Socialistische Gids 16 (1931) 824–831;
 Rn. Ms. Noto Soeroto, Een groote Nederlander. Bij het afscheid van jhr.mr. A.C.D. de Graeff van Indonesië, in Oedaya 8 (1931) 124–125;
 Herman Smit: Landvoogd tussen twee vuren. jonkheer mr. A.C.D. de Graeff, gouverneur-generaal van Nederlands-Indie 1926-1931. , (2011)

External links

 Portraits of the Governor-Generals of the Dutch East Indies on KITLV

1872 births
1957 deaths
Governors-General of the Dutch East Indies
Ministers of Foreign Affairs of the Netherlands
Ambassadors of the Netherlands to Japan
Dutch nobility
Andries Cornelis Dirk, Graeff de
Politicians from The Hague
Commanders of the Order of the Netherlands Lion
Independent politicians in the Netherlands
20th-century Dutch East Indies people